Tsagaanchuluut (White rock) is a sum of Zavkhan Province in western Mongolia. In 2005, its population was 1,496.

References 

Districts of Zavkhan Province